The 2014 Belarusian Premier League was the 24th season of top-tier football in Belarus. It began in March 2014 and ended in November 2014. BATE Borisov are the defending champions, having won their 10th league title last year.

Format
The format of the competition stayed the same as the previous season. The league took place in two phases. The first phase consisted of regular double-round robin tournament between 12 teams. The best six teams qualified for the championship round, which will determine the champions and the participants for the 2014–15 European competitions. The remaining six teams play in the relegation group, where the top five teams will secure places in the 2015 competition, sixth team (12th overall) will play a two-legged relegation play-off against the third-placed team of the First League. All points collected during the first phase will count for the second phase as well. The league will be expanded to 14 teams for 2015 season and further expanded to 16 teams for 2016.

Teams

Slavia Mozyr were relegated to the First League after finishing on the last (12th) position in 2013 season. Slutsk, the champions of 2013 First League, made their debut in the top flight.

Dnepr Mogilev, as the 11th-placed team in 2013 Premier League, had to compete in the relegation/promotion playoffs against First League runners-up Gorodeya. Dnepr won the playoff, 3–1 on aggregate, and both team retained positions in their respective leagues.

First phase

League table

Results
Each team will play twice against every other team for a total of 22 matches.

Championship round
The best six teams of the first phase will play two times against every other team for a total of 10 matches.

League table

Results
The best six teams of the first phase will play twice against every other team for a total of 10 matches.

Relegation group

League table

Results
The last six teams of the first phase will play twice against every other team for a total of 10 matches.

Relegation playoffs
The 12th-place finisher of this season (Dnepr Mogilev) played a two-legged relegation play-off against the third team of the 2014 Belarusian First League (Vitebsk) for one spot in the 2015 Premier League. Dnepr Mogilev were relegated to the Belarusian First League after losing the first leg 0–2, before drawing 1–1 in the second.

Vitebsk won 3–1 on aggregate and gains promotion to the Belarusian Premier League.

Top goalscorers

Updated to games played on 30 November 2014 Source: football.by

See also
2014 Belarusian First League
2013–14 Belarusian Cup
2014–15 Belarusian Cup

References

External links
 Official site 

Belarusian Premier League seasons
1
Belarus
Belarus